Flooded gum may refer to the following tree species:

Eucalyptus grandis, from eastern Australia
Eucalyptus rudis, from Western Australia
Eucalyptus tereticornis, from eastern Australia and southern New Guinea